Jacquelyn Lonje Olayiwola Oyeshola Bolayemi Aina (born August 4, 1987), better known as Jackie Aina, is an American beauty YouTuber. She was born to an African-American mother and a Nigerian father of Yoruba descent. She is a social influencer who advocates for visibility of people of color in the cosmetic industry. She has partnered with Anastasia Beverly Hills, e.l.f. Cosmetics, Too Faced, Sephora and Sigma Beauty.

Early career 
After two years of college, Aina joined the United States Army Reserve. Aina launched her Youtube channel one year after joining the military. Her YouTube videos were a way of expressing herself and coping with her unhappy marriage at the time. She was later divorced. While she was stationed in Hawaii, she found that she had a knack as a makeup artist and was hired by MAC Cosmetics. According to Entrepreneur, Aina "kept getting told at makeup counters that the trends she wanted to try wouldn't work for her complexion", and so she started creating videos "about the products and looks she loved that could work for anyone".

Advocacy 
Aina argues that people of color are poorly represented and often ignored in the beauty industry, and has criticized makeup shade ranges for not being inclusive. She has continuously pointed out the lack of darker shade ranges for foundations within lines. She told Bustle in 2018, "We all come from so many different backgrounds and we also come in different shades and varieties, and what may be something that I'd be willing to overlook may not be the case for someone else." In addition to foundation shades, Aina said that eye shadow, blush and lipstick colors aren't universal for skin tones.

While Aina's criticism of cosmetics companies has compromised relations that she had with several of them, she asserts that her intention is never to disparage them.

Aina disapproved of people who claim that they "don't see color", saying that they ignore racial issues and discourage her from discussing them. In a YouTube video demonstration, she did an ordinary makeup tutorial in black-and-white, and subsequently revealed that she had put on makeup of the wrong color.

After IT Cosmetics co-founder and CEO Jamie Kern Lima criticized the beauty industry for non-inclusive and unrealistic depictions of women in advertising, Aina, who had previously criticized IT Cosmetics, confronted her and the rest of the industry about excluding people of color and accepting critiques from a white woman.

Collaborations 
In July 2016, Aina teamed up with e.l.f. Cosmetics to create an eye shadow palette. 

In March 2017, Sigma Beauty released a set of five " Must Have" brushes created by Aina.

In December 2017, Aina announced that she would launch two rose gold powder highlighters, La Bronze and La Peach, with Artist Couture.

Aina expressed her opinion that a foundation product by cosmetics brand Too Faced did not feature enough shades, Too Faced announced a collaboration with her to expand the shade range of its Born This Way foundation. By June 2018, the shade range had been expanded from 24 to 35 shades. Nine of the eleven new shades were formulated by Aina, where several had sold out. She said that she listened to perspectives of her online followers and other influencers of color. Aina said that the collaboration wasn't a result of the effect that Fenty Beauty had on the cosmetic industry after it launched a foundation in 40 shades in 2017, and that she and Too Faced had not known about it. She also said that the brand had reached out to her in efforts to diversify their products long before she had such a large online following.

Aina told Bustle in 2018 that she would create a cosmetics line by 2019.

In August 2019, Aina released an eyeshadow palette in collaboration with Anastasia Beverly Hills. On the included shades, Aina said, "the palette is for everyone but my priority was making sure I chose shades that would specifically work for dark and deep-dark complexions."

Forvr Mood 
On July 13, 2020, Aina announced the release of her home goods line, Forvr Mood, which will sell candles, skin-care products, and fragrances.

Awards 
At the 49th NAACP Image Awards on January 15, 2018, Aina won the NAACP Image Award for "YouTuber of the Year". The NAACP introduced the award category in partnership with Google, in 2018.

See also
List of Yoruba people

References

External links 
 YouTube channel
 
 OkayAfrica interview

Living people
1987 births
Beauty and makeup YouTubers
YouTube channels launched in 2006
American people of Nigerian descent
American people of Yoruba descent
Yoruba women in business
American cosmetics businesspeople
American women in business
United States Army reservists
Female United States Army personnel
African-American female military personnel
American make-up artists
Fashion YouTubers
Yoruba female military personnel
21st-century African-American people
21st-century African-American women
20th-century African-American people
20th-century African-American women
African-American United States Army personnel
YouTubers from California